Psammodrilidae is a family of polychaetes belonging to the order Spionida.

Genera:
 Psammodrilus Swedmark, 1952

References

Polychaetes